Paradombeya is a genus of flowering plants belonging to the family Malvaceae.

Its native range is Southern Central China to Indo-China.

Species
Species:

Paradombeya burmanica 
Paradombeya multiflora 
Paradombeya sinensis

References

Dombeyoideae
Malvaceae genera